Caravan Farm Theatre is a professional outdoor theatre company operated by the Bill Miner Society for Cultural Advancement. The theatre is based on an  farm, 11 kilometres northwest of Armstrong, British Columbia. Caravan Farm Theatre productions are always mounted outdoors in site-specific locations, with audiences of up to 500 at its farm location, three seasons of the year. Annually, Caravan Farm Theatre productions attract between 13,000 and 16,000 theatre-goers each year.

History
The Caravan Farm Theatre had its genesis as a puppet troupe formed in 1970 by Paul Kirby and Adriana Kelder called The Little People's Caravan. The Little People's Caravan toured Vancouver Island by means of a horse-drawn wagon. In 1975, the troupe changed its name to The Caravan Stage Company. In 1978, the company began mounting more and larger tours, each pulled by a team of Clydesdales. In 1979, the Caravan Stage Company purchased a farm outside of Armstrong, as a base of operations and as a stud farm for its horses.

In 1984, Kirby and Kelder embarked on a three-year tour of the western United States. This resulted in a dispute arising in the Caravan Stage Company as to whether its focus was as a touring company or as a company based on the farm. This resulted in the division of the Caravan Stage Company into two separate entitites: the Caravan Stage Company (which is now based out of Kingston, Ontario, and the Caravan Farm Theatre, which continues to be based on the farm near Armstrong. Former Caravan Stage Company member Nick Hutchison (son of Jeremy Hutchinson, an English Baron, and  actress Dame Peggy Ashcroft) became the founding Artistic Director of the Caravan Farm Theatre. Caravan Farm Theatre soon began producing a mix of original and classic works for local audiences, often utilising the skills of actors, designers, musicians, and technicians who lived on or near the farm property. In 1989, the company began operating a one-act winter sleigh ride show.

Hutchison stepped down as Artistic Director in 1993. After a brief period of operations under an interim group, composer and writer Allen Cole took over as the new Artistic Director. Cole served in that role until 1998, when he was replaced by Estelle Shook (whose first exposure to the company was in 1979 when her mother took a job there as a cook) and Jennifer Brewin as Co-artistic Directors. In 2005, Brewin stepped down, leaving Shook to carry on in the position.

In 2008, through the assistance of a local charitable organization, Caravan Farm Theatre built a rain venue on the farm. The rain venue allows the company to continue performances despite inclement weather, for audiences of up to 200 people.

Shook chose to leave the Artistic Director position in 2010. To mark the occasion, six Vancouver theatre companies joined with Caravan Farm Theatre to mount a production of Everyone, a modern morality play. The play featured seven scenes with seven Clydesdale and Fjord-drawn wagons.

Shook was replaced as Artistic Director by actor, director and choreographer Courtenay Dobbie in September 2010.

Contributors
Many noted Canadian theatre artists have contributed to Caravan Farm Theatre productions over many years, including:
Peter Anderson, star of the CanStage production of The Overcoat
Peter Hinton, Artistic Director of the National Arts Centre in Ottawa.
Vincent de Tourdonnet, writer of musicals produced by CanStage, The National Arts Centre and La Place Des Arts.
 Martin Julien,  Toronto stage and TV actor
Amiel Gladstone, West Coast based playwright and director, who wrote Caravan Farm Theatre productions We Three Queens, and East O' the Sun, West O' the Moon.

Representative productions
Plays produced by the Caravan Farm Theatre include:

 A Midsummer Night's Dream
 Everyone
 The Story
 The Secret Sorrow of Hatchet Jack MacPhee
 Mother Courage and her Children
 King Lear
 The Blue Horse
 East O' the Sun West O' the Moon
 The Tell Tale Heart
 Macbeth
 We Three Queens
 The I O U Land
 A Night in the Woods
 Cyrano of the Northwest
 Horseplay
 Cowboy King
 The Dog and the Angel

References

External links

Theatre companies in British Columbia
Theatres in British Columbia
Tourist attractions in the Okanagan